Culex (Culiciomyia) fragilis is a species of mosquito belonging to the genus Culex. It is found in India, Sri Lanka, Borneo, Malaysia, Cambodia, Indonesia, Malaysia, New Guinea (Island); Papua New Guinea, Philippines, Solomon Islands, Thailand, and Vietnam.

References

External links 
A review of the mosquito species (Diptera: Culicidae) of Bangladesh

fragilis
Insects described in 1903